George Huntington (August 24, 1796 Mansfield, Tolland County, Connecticut — November 19, 1866 Bath, Steuben County, New York) was an American farmer and politician from New York.

Life
He was the son of Jonas Huntington (1754–1830) and Rhoda (Baldwin) Huntington (1758–1824). On May 15, 1819, he married Anna Neally, and the couple settled at Bath NY. They had no children.

He was Sheriff of Steuben County from 1832 to 1834.

He was a member of the New York State Senate (6th D.) from 1836 to 1839, sitting in the 59th, 60th, 61st and 62nd New York State Legislatures.

In 1840, he was appointed Marshal to take the U.S. Census in Steuben County, and later was a Justice of the Peace in Bath.

Sources
The New York Civil List compiled by Franklin Benjamin Hough (pages 131f, 142 and 407; Weed, Parsons and Co., 1858)
A Genealogical Memoir of the Huntington Family in This Country by Elijah Baldwin Huntington (Stamford CT, 1863; pg. 219)

1796 births
1866 deaths
Democratic Party New York (state) state senators
People from Mansfield, Connecticut
People from Bath, New York
Sheriffs of Steuben County, New York
19th-century American politicians